Henry Lopes may refer to:

Henry Lopes, 1st Baron Roborough (1859–1938)
Henry Lopes, 1st Baron Ludlow (1828–1899)
Henry Lopes, 2nd Baron Ludlow (1865–1922)

See also
Henri Lopes (born 1937), Congolese writer, diplomat, and political figure
Henry López (disambiguation)